Shivalik Sharma (born 28 November 1998) is an Indian cricketer. He made his first-class debut for Baroda in the 2018–19 Ranji Trophy on 6 December 2018.

References

External links
 

1998 births
Living people
Indian cricketers
Place of birth missing (living people)
Baroda cricketers